Brzyski (feminine: Brzyska, plural: Brzyscy) is a surname of Polish language origin. It may refer to:

People
  (born 1967), Polish instrumentalist professor
  (born 1977), Polish priest and Franciscan friar, philosopher, and theologian
  (born 1973), Polish actor
 Jerzy Brzyski (born 1949), Polish doctor of physical sciences, football coach, and former football manager
 Tomasz Brzyski (born 1982), Polish footballer who plays as a left back or midfielder
  (1931–2020), Polish chemistry professor

Places
 Brzyska, a village in Jasło County, Subcarpathian Voivodeship, in south-eastern Poland
 Brzyska Wola, a village in the administrative district of Gmina Kuryłówka, within Leżajsk County, Subcarpathian Voivodeship, in south-eastern Poland
 Gmina Brzyska, a rural gmina (administrative district) in Jasło County, Subcarpathian Voivodeship, in south-eastern Poland

See also
 
 

Polish-language surnames